State Road 279 (NM 279) is a  state highway in the US state of New Mexico. NM 279's southern terminus is at NM 124 in Laguna, and the northern terminus is at the end of state maintenance at County Route 5 (CR 5) south of Seboyeta.

Major intersections

See also

References

279
Transportation in Cibola County, New Mexico